Handsome Tigers is a South Korean basketball reality show program. It airs on SBS every Friday at 11:10 PM KST.

Overview
A real basketball entertainment program that surrounds former basketball legend Seo Jang-hoon, where celebrities who love basketball are recruited to form a basketball team. The team gets trained by Seo and then eventually participates in a tournament.

Cast

Coach
 Seo Jang-hoon

Manager
 Joy (Red Velvet)

Players
 Lee Sang-yoon - No. 7 (Captain)
  - No. 11
 Seo Ji-seok - No. 23
 Julien Kang - No. 32
  (Mighty Mouth) - No. 8
 Kang Kyung-joon - No. 42
 Moon Su-inn - No. 10 (Ace Player)
 Lee Tae-sun - No. 3
 Cha Eun-woo (Astro) - No. 97
 Yoo Seon-ho - No. 30
 Kang In-soo - No. 1
 Jeon Ji-hoon - No. 37

Match schedules

Ratings

Award and Nomination

References

External links
  

South Korean variety television shows
Korean-language television shows
2020 South Korean television series debuts
2020 South Korean television series endings
Seoul Broadcasting System original programming